Dario Biocca teaches European history at the University of Perugia, Italy and has been Coordinatore at Scuola di giornalismo Radiotelevisivo (Perugia). He has a Ph.D. from the University of California, Berkeley and has taught at various institutions in the US and Italy. He is currently at UC Berkeley teaching a course on "Walls: Separation and Integration" and 20th Century Italy.

Biocca has published:
"Ignazio Silone, La Doppia Vita di un Italiano", Rizzoli 2005;
"L'Informatore. Silone, i Comunisti e la Polizia", Luni 2000; with Mauro Canali]
"A Matter of Passion. Selected Letters of Bernard Berenson and Clotilde Marghieri", Berkeley and Los Angeles 1989.
"Il Muro di Belfast"—An astonishing article on the Belfast cemetery, where a 'sunken wall' separates Catholic graves from Protestant ones - Eerie!, La Rebubblica 15 July 2007
 "La bella addormentata"—A reportage from the walled-up city of Famagusta, Cyprus.La Repubblica, May 5, 2008.

Footnotes

20th-century Italian historians
Academic staff of the University of Perugia
University of California, Berkeley alumni
Living people
Year of birth missing (living people)
21st-century Italian historians